Osternienburg was a Verwaltungsgemeinschaft ("collective municipality") in the Anhalt-Bitterfeld district, in Saxony-Anhalt, Germany. The seat of the Verwaltungsgemeinschaft was in Osternienburg. It was disbanded on 1 January 2010.

The Verwaltungsgemeinschaft Osternienburg consisted of the following municipalities:

References

Former Verwaltungsgemeinschaften in Saxony-Anhalt